Aleksander Illi (22 December 1912 – 25 January 2000) was an Estonian basketball player. He competed in the 1936 Summer Olympics.

References

External links
 
 
 

1912 births
2000 deaths
People from Jõgeva Parish
People from Kreis Dorpat
Estonian men's basketball players
Olympic basketball players of Estonia
Basketball players at the 1936 Summer Olympics
University of Tartu alumni